Nucella rolani is a species of sea snail, a marine gastropod mollusk in the family Muricidae, the murex snails or rock snails.

Description
The shell size is up to 24 mm

Distribution
This species is distributed in the Atlantic Ocean along Portugal and Northwest Spain.

References

External links
 

Muricidae
Gastropods described in 1984